Adam Miller (1883 – 21 December 1917) was a Scottish professional footballer who played in the Scottish League for Hibernian and Raith Rovers as a centre forward.

Personal life 
Miller was educated at Eyemouth Public School. Prior to emigrating to Brisbane, Australia in 1912, he worked as a tailor and served in the Royal Garrison Artillery. In December 1914, four months after the outbreak of the First World War, he attested as a private in the 9th Battalion, Royal Queensland Regiment in Ayr. On 8 April 1915, Miller departed for the fighting from Brisbane on the HMAT Star of England and saw action at Gallipoli and on the Western Front. He was promoted to lance corporal in August 1916, but immediately reverted to private upon his own request.

During the course of his service, Miller suffered from several bouts of dysentery and was twice disciplined for going AWOL, for which he received field punishments no. 1 and 2 respectively. In May 1917, Miller was recommended for the Military Medal after showing "gallant conduct and devotion to duty under fire as [a] stretcher-bearer" during the Second Battle of Bullecourt, but he did not receive the award. On 21 December 1917, Miller was "killed carrying rations at Fanny's Dump, corner of Fanny's Street", in the vicinity of Messines. He is commemorated on the Menin Gate.

Career statistics

References 

Scottish footballers
1917 deaths
Australian military personnel killed in World War I
1883 births
Australian Army soldiers
Scottish Football League players
People from Eyemouth
Berwick Rangers F.C. players
Association football forwards
Hibernian F.C. players
Raith Rovers F.C. players
Scottish emigrants to Australia
Coldstream F.C. players
British tailors
Royal Garrison Artillery soldiers
20th-century British Army personnel
Scottish military personnel